= East Bay Children's Book Project =

Non-profit group in Oakland, California, US

- Formation: May 2005
- Type: 501(c)(3) non-profit
- Location: Oakland, California
- Region served: East Bay
- Board President: Ann Katz
- Website: www.eastbaychildrensbookproject.org

The East Bay Children's Book Project is a non-profit group that assists literacy efforts by distributing books to children who do not have access to enough books. They have distributed more than 1,000,000 books since 2005. Books donated by the East Bay Children's Book Project have been used in schools, day-care centers, community centers, homeless shelters, and hospitals. The East Bay Children's Book Project is located in Oakland, California.

== History ==
The East Bay Children's Book Project was founded in May 2005 by a group of retired teachers led by Ana Katz. The group initially distributed books from the founders' personal collections before expanding to accept donations from publishers, bookstores, and members of the public.

In 2009, they became a 501(c)(3) non-profit group.

In 2017, the organization had distributed more than 1.6 million books.
